Szuha is a village in Nógrád county, Hungary.

Etymology
The name comes from the Slavic word suchá: dry.

References

External links 
 Street map 

Populated places in Nógrád County